Mammal Review is a zoology journal published by Wiley-Blackwell on behalf of The Mammal Society. Covering all areas of mammalian biology, ecology, physiology, behaviour, biogeography and conservation biology, the journal is edited by Danilo Russo, with Nancy Jennings as the Managing Editor. The journal has a current impact factor of 5.373, which corresponds to a ranking of 32/174 (Ecology) and 5/177 (Zoology).

References 

Mammalogy journals
Wiley-Blackwell academic journals
English-language journals